Denis Hallinan (14 November 1849, Graigue – 2 July 1923, Limerick) was an Irish Roman Catholic bishop.

Keane was educated at The Irish College, Rome and ordained in 1874. After a curacy in Jersey he joined the staff of St Munchin's College. He served in Newcastle West and Limerick. Hallinan was appointed Bishop of Limerick on 10 January 1918. He was consecrated on 2 March that year and died in post. He received the degree of Doctor of Divinity (DD).

References

1849 births
Alumni of The Irish College, Rome
1923 deaths
20th-century Roman Catholic bishops in Ireland
Roman Catholic bishops of Limerick